Víctor Emilio Galíndez (2 November 1948 in Vedia – 25 October 1980 in Veinticinco de Mayo, Buenos Aires) was an Argentine boxer who was the third Latin American to win the world Light Heavyweight championship, after Puerto Rico's José Torres and Venezuela's Vicente Rondon.

Galíndez was born in Vedia in the Leandro N. Alem Partido of the Buenos Aires Province in Argentina in 1948. He aspired to become both a boxer and a stock car pilot since an early age, but he was more interested in boxing. As an amateur, he compiled a winning record and participated in the 1968 Summer Olympics in Mexico City, where he lost in a preliminary round bout to Aldo Bentini of Italy. A year earlier he claimed the silver medal at the 1967 Pan American Games.

Galíndez then turned professional, and on 10 May 1969, he debuted as a paid fighter with a win over Ramon Ruiz by a knockout in four at Buenos Aires. After one more win, he faced Adolfo Cejas in Azul, Argentina, in a fight which resulted in a ten-round draw.

In 1970, Galíndez had 10 fights, a span during which he went 5-3-1, with one no contest. He suffered his first loss, at the hands of Juan Aguilar, by a decision in ten, and had a second and third fight with Aguilar, of which the second ended in a first round no contest, and the second in another Aguilar decision win. He began his five fight rivalry with Jorge Ahumada knocking Ahumada out in five rounds, and lost the Argentine Light Heavyweight title with a twelve-round decision defeat against Avenamar Peralta.

He and Peralta had an immediate, non-title rematch in 1971, and Galíndez won by a ten-round decision. 1971 was a year of rematches for Galíndez, the only new boxer he met that year being Pedro Rimovsky, and he too, had a rematch with Galíndez before that year was over. He lost to Ahumada in the second of the five fights between them, by a decision in Mendoza, Argentina, then beat him in fight three by a knockout in nine, and in fight four by a knockout in six, both the third and fourth fight being held in Buenos Aires. He and Rimovsky had a first round no contest in their first bout, and drew over the ten round distance in the rematch, and then Galíndez had two more fights with Peralta, losing by a knockout in nine and a decision in 10.

In 1973, Galíndez had eight fights, winning seven and drawing one. He was finally able to obtain Argentina's Light Heavyweight title, by beating Aguilar by a decision in twelve. He beat Aguilar once again, by a knockout in six, and he also beat Eddie Owens, Eddie Duncan and Raul Loyola, the latter being beaten twice, one time defending his Argentine title.

He began 1974 with a step up in class, meeting former world title challenger Ray Anderson, beating him by a knockout in two. After six more consecutive wins, he was given his first shot at a world title, facing Len Hutchins for the WBA's vacant world Light Heavyweight championship. Galíndez then joined Torres and Rondon as the only Hispanic Light Heavyweight world champions in history, and Carlos Monzón as the only Argentine world champions of that era, with a TKO of Hutchins in the thirteenth round to become the WBA's world Light Heavyweight champion.

Galíndez, who never fought outside Argentina before becoming a world champion, became a traveling fighter after that. After he beat Johnny Griffin in Buenos Aires by knockout in six in a non-title bout, it was off to South Africa, for his first international fight, which was, at the same time, his first world title defense. He beat Pierre Fourie there by a decision. Next was Las Vegas, for his first fight in the United States, another non title affair. He knocked out Ray Elson in eight there. Next stop was the Madison Square Garden in New York, where he and arch-rival Ahumada met for a fifth time, this time with the world title on the line. After beating Ahumada by a decision in 15, Galíndez returned to South Africa, where he once again beat Fourie by decision in 15.

1976 saw a trip to Norway, where he beat Harald Skog by a knockout in three to retain the title, and to Denmark, where he beat Jesse Burnett by a decision in ten in a non tite affair. Then came a third trip to South Africa, where he knocked out challenger Richie Kates in the 15th and last round, and, after a fight with Billy Douglas in Buenos Aires, (a win by decision in ten) he found himself in South Africa once again, where he beat Kosie Smith by a decision in fifteen to once again, retain the title.

After beginning 1977 by beating Guillermo Aquirrezabala by a knockout in four in Mendoza, he and Kates had a rematch in Rome, Italy, where Galíndez once again beat Kates by decision over 15. Next, the Argentine champion and challenger Yaqui López faced-off in a 15-round title bout, once again in Italy, and Galíndez retained the title by a decision in Rome. Galíndez' last fight of '77 took him to Italy for a third time, and he beat future world champion Eddie Mustafa Muhammad (then Eddie Gregory) by a decision in fifteen.

In 1978, Galíndez went to Italy again, retaining the title with a fifteen-round decision in a rematch with Lopez, and then he made a series of non-title bouts in Argentina before he went on the road again, this time losing his title to Mike Rossman by a knockout in 13, in the same undercard where Muhammad Ali recovered the world Heavyweight title for the third time by beating Leon Spinks at the Louisiana Superdome in New Orleans.

After his first fight in 1979, beating Roberto Aguilar by a knockout in six back home, he and Rossman were supposed to have a rematch in February of that year, but Galíndez refused to fight, arguing that the judges selected for the rematch would probably favor Rossman. However, the rematch did come off later that year, and Galíndez recovered the world championship, once again in New Orleans, knocking Rossman out in 10 rounds. This time, however, he wouldn't last long as king of the Light Heavyweights, and he lost the title in his first defense, by a knockout in 11 to Marvin Johnson, a boxer who would later join Muhammad Ali, Sugar Ray Robinson and Carlos De León among others as one of the few boxers to be world champions three times in the same category. The fight with Johnson also took place in New Orleans.

He had a boxing record of 52 wins, 9 losses and 4 draws with 2 no contests, and 34 wins by knockout. He successfully defended the WBA world light heavyweight title ten times against seven boxers.

In 2002, Galíndez was inducted into the International Boxing Hall of Fame.

Death 
After losing a rematch with Burnett in 1980 by a decision in twelve in Anaheim, California, Galíndez was forced to retire because of two operations to repair his detached retinas, and then he tried to pursue his other dream of becoming a stock-car race driver. On 25 October of that year, he participated in what would be his first and last Turismo Carretera race, as a co-driver. After a mechanical failure shortly after the start of the race, Galíndez and his driver Antonio Lizeviche headed towards the pits, walking alongside the road. A car of another competitor lost control and hit Galíndez and Lizeviche, killing them on the spot.

Professional boxing record

|-
|align="center" colspan=8|55 Wins (34 knockouts, 21 decisions), 9 Losses (3 knockouts, 6 decisions), 4 Draws, 2 No Contests 
|-
| align="center" style="border-style: none none solid solid; background: #e3e3e3"|Result
| align="center" style="border-style: none none solid solid; background: #e3e3e3"|Record
| align="center" style="border-style: none none solid solid; background: #e3e3e3"|Opponent
| align="center" style="border-style: none none solid solid; background: #e3e3e3"|Type
| align="center" style="border-style: none none solid solid; background: #e3e3e3"|Round
| align="center" style="border-style: none none solid solid; background: #e3e3e3"|Date
| align="center" style="border-style: none none solid solid; background: #e3e3e3"|Location
| align="center" style="border-style: none none solid solid; background: #e3e3e3"|Notes
|-align=center
|Loss
|54–9–4 
|align=left| Jesse Burnett
|UD
|12
|14 June 1980
|align=left| Disneyland Hotel, Anaheim, California, United States
|
|-
|Loss
|54–8–4 
|align=left| Marvin Johnson
|KO
|11
|30 November 1979
|align=left| Louisiana Superdome, New Orleans, Louisiana, United States
|align=left|
|-
|Win
|55–7–4 
|align=left| Mike Rossman
|RTD
|9
|14 April 1979
|align=left| Louisiana Superdome, New Orleans, Louisiana, United States
|align=left|
|-
|Win
|54–7–4 
|align=left| Roberto Gustavo Aguilar
|RTD
|8
|9 March 1979
|align=left| San Miguel de Tucuman, Argentina
|align=left|
|-
|Loss
|53–7–4 
|align=left| Mike Rossman
|TKO
|13
|15 September 1978
|align=left| Louisiana Superdome, New Orleans, Louisiana, United States
|align=left|
|-
|Win
|53–6–4 
|align=left| Marcos Antonio Tosto
|KO
|6
|19 August 1978
|align=left| General Pico, Argentina
|align=left|
|-
|Win
|52–6–4 
|align=left| Waldemar de Oliveira
|KO
|9
|8 July 1978
|align=left| Estadio Luna Park, Buenos Aires, Buenos Aires, Argentina
|align=left|
|-
|Win
|51–6–4 
|align=left| Juan Antonio Musladino
|KO
|9
|16 June 1978
|align=left| Mendoza, Argentina
|align=left|
|-
|Win
|50–6–4 
|align=left| Yaqui Lopez
|UD
|15
|6 May 1978
|align=left| La Bussola Teatro Tenda, Viareggio, Italy
|align=left|
|-
|Win
|49–6–4 
|align=left| Ramon Reinaldo Cerrezuela
|PTS
|10
|8 April 1978
|align=left| Estadio Luna Park, Buenos Aires, Buenos Aires, Argentina
|align=left|
|-
|Win
|48–6–4 
|align=left| Eddie Mustafa Muhammad
|UD
|15
|20 November 1977
|align=left| Palazzo dello Sport di Parco Ruffini, Torino, Italy
|align=left|
|-
|Win
|47–6–4 
|align=left| Yaqui Lopez
|UD
|15
|17 September 1977
|align=left| Palazzetto dello Sport, Rome, Italy
|align=left|
|-
|Win
|46–6–4 
|align=left| Richie Kates
|UD
|15
|18 June 1977
|align=left| Palazzetto dello Sport, Rome, Italy
|align=left|
|-
|Win
|45–6–4 
|align=left| Guillermo Aguirrezabala
|KO
|4
|6 April 1977
|align=left| Mendoza, Argentina
|align=left|
|-
|Win
|44–6–4 
|align=left| Kosie Smith
|UD
|15
|5 October 1976
|align=left| Rand Stadium, Johannesburg, South Africa
|align=left|
|-
|Win
|43–6–4 
|align=left| Billy Douglas
|PTS
|10
|21 August 1976
|align=left| Estadio Luna Park, Buenos Aires, Buenos Aires, Argentina
|align=left|
|-
|Win
|42–6–4 
|align=left| Richie Kates
|KO
|15
|22 May 1976
|align=left| Rand Stadium, Johannesburg, South Africa
|align=left|
|-
|Win
|41–6–4 
|align=left| Jesse Burnett
|SD
|10
|8 April 1976
|align=left| K.B. Hallen, Copenhagen, Denmark
|align=left|
|-
|Win
|40–6–4 
|align=left| Harald Skog
|KO
|3
|28 March 1976
|align=left| Ekeberg Hall, Oslo, Norway
|align=left|
|-
|Win
|39–6–4 
|align=left| Pierre Fourie
|SD
|15
|13 September 1975
|align=left| Rand Stadium, Johannesburg, South Africa
|align=left|
|-
|Win
|38–6–4 
|align=left| Jorge Ahumada
|UD
|15
|30 June 1975
|align=left| Madison Square Garden, New York City, United States
|align=left|
|-
|Win
|37–6–4 
|align=left| "Communist" Ray Elson
|TKO
|8
|16 May 1975
|align=left| Las Vegas Convention Center, Las Vegas, Nevada, South Africa
|align=left|
|-
|Win
|36–6–4 
|align=left| Pierre Fourie
|UD
|15
|7 April 1975
|align=left| Ellis Park Stadium, Johannesburg, South Africa
|align=left|
|-
|Win
|35–6–4 
|align=left| Johnny Griffin
|KO
|6
|15 February 1975
|align=left| Balcarce, Buenos Aires Province, Argentina
|align=left|
|-
|Win
|34–6–4 
|align=left| Len Hutchins
|TKO
|13
|7 December 1974
|align=left| Estadio Luna Park, Buenos Aires, Buenos Aires, Argentina
|align=left|
|-
|Win
|33–6–4 
|align=left| Domingo Silveira
|KO
|4
|5 October 1974
|align=left| Parana, Entre Rios, Argentina
|align=left|
|-
|Win
|32–6–4 
|align=left| Angel Oquendo
|PTS
|10
|14 September 1974
|align=left| Estadio Luna Park, Buenos Aires, Buenos Aires, Argentina
|align=left|
|-
|Win
|31–6–4 
|align=left| Domingo Silveira
|KO
|5
|1 September 1974
|align=left| San Juan, La Rioja, Argentina
|align=left|
|-
|Win
|30–6–4 
|align=left| Domingo Silveira
|KO
|4
|12 July 1974
|align=left| San Salvador de Jujuy, Argentina
|align=left|
|-
|Win
|29–6–4 
|align=left| Jose Gonzalez
|PTS
|10
|8 June 1974
|align=left| Estadio Luna Park, Buenos Aires, Buenos Aires, Argentina
|align=left|
|-
|Win
|28–6–4 
|align=left| Ruben Macario Gonzalez
|KO
|3
|5 April 1974
|align=left| Rio Cuarto, Cordoba, Argentina
|align=left|
|-
|Win
|27–6–4 
|align=left| Ray Anderson
|KO
|2
|16 February 1974
|align=left| Balcarce, Buenos Aires Province, Argentina
|
|-
|Win
|26–6–4 
|align=left| Eddie Duncan
|KO
|2
|8 December 1973
|align=left| Estadio Luna Park, Buenos Aires, Buenos Aires, Argentina
|align=left|
|-
|Win
|25–6–4 
|align=left| Raul Arturo Loyola
|TKO
|8
|10 November 1973
|align=left| Estadio Luna Park, Buenos Aires, Buenos Aires, Argentina
|align=left|
|-
|Win
|24–6–4 
|align=left| Raul Arturo Loyola
|PTS
|12
|7 September 1973
|align=left| Estadio Luna Park, Buenos Aires, Buenos Aires, Argentina
|align=left|
|-
|Win
|23–6–4 
|align=left| Juan Aguilar
|KO
|6
|10 August 1973
|align=left| San Miguel de Tucuman, Argentina
|align=left|
|-
|Win
|22–6–4 
|align=left| Karl Zurheide
|KO
|2
|14 July 1973
|align=left| Estadio Luna Park, Buenos Aires, Buenos Aires, Argentina
|align=left|
|-
|Win
|21–6–4 
|align=left| Eddie Owens
|KO
|3
|12 May 1973
|align=left| Estadio Luna Park, Buenos Aires, Buenos Aires, Argentina
|align=left|
|-
|Win
|20–6–4 
|align=left| Juan Aguilar
|PTS
|12
|14 April 1973
|align=left| Estadio Luna Park, Buenos Aires, Buenos Aires, Argentina
|align=left|
|-
|Win
|19–6–4 
|align=left| Ruben Macario Gonzalez
|KO
|3
|29 January 1973
|align=left| Salta, Argentina
|align=left|
|-
|Draw
|18–6–4 
|align=left| Juan Aguilar
|PTS
|10
|15 December 1972
|align=left| Mendoza, Argentina
|align=left|
|-
|Win
|18–6–3 
|align=left| Oscar Wondryk
|KO
|7
|10 November 1972
|align=left| Venado Tuerto, Argentina
|align=left|
|-
|Win
|17–6–3 
|align=left| Avenamar Peralta
|PTS
|12
|7 October 1972
|align=left| Estadio Luna Park, Buenos Aires, Buenos Aires, Argentina
|align=left|
|-
|Win
|16–6–3 
|align=left| Avenamar Peralta
|PTS
|12
|2 September 1972
|align=left| Estadio Luna Park, Buenos Aires, Buenos Aires, Argentina
|align=left|
|-
|Win
|15–6–3 
|align=left| Adolfo Jorge Cardozo
|TKO
|4
|19 August 1972
|align=left| Rosario Teatro Real, Rosario, Santa Fe, Argentina
|align=left|
|-
|Win
|14–6–3 
|align=left| Juan Aguilar
|PTS
|12
|22 July 1972
|align=left| Estadio Luna Park, Buenos Aires, Buenos Aires, Argentina
|align=left|
|-
|Win
|13–6–3 
|align=left| Eddie Jones
|PTS
|10
|6 May 1972
|align=left| Estadio Luna Park, Buenos Aires, Buenos Aires, Argentina
|align=left|
|-
|Win
|12–6–3 
|align=left| Carlos Santagada
|TKO
|8
|22 January 1972
|align=left| Nueve de Julio, Buenos Aires Province, Argentina
|align=left|
|-
|Loss
|11–6–3 
|align=left| Avenamar Peralta
|PTS
|10
|18 December 1971
|align=left| Estadio Luna Park, Buenos Aires, Buenos Aires, Argentina
|align=left|
|-
|Win
|11–5–3 
|align=left| Juan Aguilar
|PTS
|10
|20 November 1971
|align=left| Estadio Luna Park, Buenos Aires, Buenos Aires, Argentina
|align=left|
|-
|Win
|10–5–3 
|align=left| Jorge Ahumada
|KO
|6
|30 October 1971
|align=left| Estadio Luna Park, Buenos Aires, Buenos Aires, Argentina
|align=left|
|-
|Loss
|9–5–3 
|align=left| Avenamar Peralta
|TKO
|9
|11 September 1971
|align=left| Estadio Luna Park, Buenos Aires, Buenos Aires, Argentina
|align=left|
|-
|Win
|9–4–3 
|align=left| Jorge Ahumada
|KO
|9
|31 July 1971
|align=left| Estadio Luna Park, Buenos Aires, Buenos Aires, Argentina
|align=left|
|-
|Draw
|8–4–3 
|align=left| Pedro Rimovsky
|PTS
|10
|12 June 1971
|align=left| Estadio Luna Park, Buenos Aires, Buenos Aires, Argentina
|align=left|
|-
|Loss
|8–4–2 
|align=left| Jorge Ahumada
|PTS
|10
|24 May 1971
|align=left| Mendoza, Argentina
|align=left|
|-
|style="background:#ddd;"|NC
|8–3–2 
|align=left| Pedro Rimovsky
|NC
|1
|7 April 1971
|align=left| Estadio Luna Park, Buenos Aires, Buenos Aires, Argentina
|align=left|
|-
|Win
|8–3–2 
|align=left| Avenamar Peralta
|PTS
|10
|9 January 1971
|align=left| Estadio Luna Park, Buenos Aires, Buenos Aires, Argentina
|align=left|
|-
|Loss
|7–3–2 
|align=left| Avenamar Peralta
|PTS
|12
|28 November 1970
|align=left| Estadio Luna Park, Buenos Aires, Buenos Aires, Argentina
|align=left|
|-
|Loss
|7–2–2 
|align=left| Juan Aguilar
|PTS
|10
|18 September 1970
|align=left| Mendoza, Argentina
|align=left|
|-
|style="background:#ddd;"|NC
|7–1–2 
|align=left| Juan Aguilar
|NC
|1
|14 August 1970
|align=left| Mendoza, Argentina
|align=left|
|-
|Win
|7–1–2
|align=left| Jorge Ahumada
|KO
|5
|22 July 1970
|align=left| Estadio Luna Park, Buenos Aires, Buenos Aires, Argentina
|align=left|
|-
|Draw
|6–1–2
|align=left| Juan Aguilar
|PTS
|10
|24 June 1970
|align=left| Estadio Luna Park, Buenos Aires, Buenos Aires, Argentina
|align=left|
|-
|Win
|6–1–1
|align=left| Alfredo Segura
|KO
|3
|20 May 1970
|align=left| Estadio Luna Park, Buenos Aires, Buenos Aires, Argentina
|align=left|
|-
|Win
|5–1–1
|align=left| Ramon Reinaldo Cerrezuela
|TKO
|9
|9 May 1970
|align=left| Lujan, Buenos Aires Province, Argentina
|align=left|
|-
|Loss
|4–1–1
|align=left| Juan Aguilar
|PTS
|10
|8 April 1970
|align=left| Estadio Luna Park, Buenos Aires, Buenos Aires, Argentina
|align=left|
|-
|Win
|4–0–1
|align=left| Ramon Rocha
|KO
|9
|13 March 1970
|align=left| Rosario, Santa Fe, Argentina
|align=left|
|-
|Win
|3–0–1
|align=left| Adolfo Jorge Cardozo
|KO
|5
|17 January 1970
|align=left| Estadio Luna Park, Buenos Aires, Buenos Aires, Argentina
|align=left|
|-
|Draw
|2–0–1
|align=left| Adolfo Cejas
|PTS
|10
|16 August 1969
|align=left| Azul, Buenos Aires Province, Argentina
|align=left|
|-
|Win
|2–0
|align=left|Ruperto Robledo
|KO
|3
|28 June 1969
|align=left| Estadio Luna Park, Buenos Aires, Buenos Aires, Argentina
|align=left|
|-
|Win
|1–0
|align=left| Ramon Ruiz
|KO
|4
|10 May 1969
|align=left| Estadio Luna Park, Buenos Aires, Buenos Aires, Argentina
|align=left|
|}

References

External links
 

1948 births
1980 deaths
Sportspeople from Buenos Aires Province
Road incident deaths in Argentina
World light-heavyweight boxing champions
World Boxing Association champions
International Boxing Hall of Fame inductees
Argentine male boxers
Pan American Games silver medalists for Argentina
Boxers at the 1967 Pan American Games
Olympic boxers of Argentina
Boxers at the 1968 Summer Olympics
Pan American Games medalists in boxing
Medalists at the 1967 Pan American Games